is a passenger railway station  located in the city of  Takarazuka Hyōgo Prefecture, Japan. It is operated by the private transportation company Hankyu Railway.

Lines

Layout
The station consists of two opposed side platforms, connected by an elevated station building. On the station building are automatic ticket vending machines, ticket gates, shops, convenience stores, and restrooms. There are escalators that connect the platform to the concourse inside the ticket gate, and the concourse outside the ticket gate to the entrance. The effective length of the platform is 6 cars for Track 1 and 8 cars for Track 2

Platforms

Adjacent stations

History
Sakasegawa  Station opened on September 2, 1921.

Passenger statistics
In fiscal 2019, the station was used by an average of 24,500 passengers daily

Surrounding area
Takarazuka City Hall
Suehiro Central Park (disaster prevention park)
Takarazuka City Working Citizen Center

See also
List of railway stations in Japan

References

External links

Sakasegawa Station (Hankyu Railway) 

Railway stations in Hyōgo Prefecture
Hankyu Railway Imazu Line
Stations of Hankyu Railway
Railway stations in Japan opened in 1921
Takarazuka, Hyōgo